was a Japanese film producer, actor and director.

Career
In 1980, Arato produced Zigeunerweisen for director Seijun Suzuki. He was unable to secure exhibitors for the film and famously exhibited it himself in a specially-built, inflatable, mobile tent. The film won four Japanese Academy Awards, including Best Picture, and was voted the best Japanese film of the 1980s by Japanese critics. He also produced Tatsushi Ōmori's The Whispering of the Gods in 2005.

In 1995, Arato directed The Girl of the Silence, which stars Mami Nakamura and Kaori Momoi. He returned with the 2003 film, Akame 48 Waterfalls, starring Takijirō Ōnishi, Michiyo Okusu and Shinobu Terajima. His 2010 film, The Fallen Angel, starred Toma Ikuta.

He died of ischemic heart disease on 7 November 2016 at the age of 70.

Filmography

Producer
 Zigeunerweisen (1980)
 Kagerō-za (1981)
 Knockout (1989)
 Tekken (1990)
 Checkmate (1991)
 Yumeji (1991)
 The Operating Room (1992)
 Tokarefu (1994)
 The Whispering of the Gods (2005)

Director
 The Girl of the Silence (1995)
 Akame 48 Waterfalls (2003)
 The Fallen Angel (2010)

References

External links
 
 

1946 births
People from Nagasaki Prefecture
Japanese film producers
Japanese male film actors
Japanese film directors
2016 deaths
Deaths from coronary artery disease